Levashovka is a rural locality (a selo) and the administrative center of Verkhnetoydenskoye Rural Settlement, Anninsky District, Voronezh Oblast, Russia. The population was 295 as of 2010. There are 2 streets.

Geography 
Levashovka is located 14 km east of Anna (the district's administrative centre) by road. Khleborodnoye is the nearest rural locality.

References 

Rural localities in Anninsky District